Marek Ujlaky may refer to:
 Marek Ujlaky (footballer, born 1974)
 Marek Ujlaky (footballer, born 2003)